The Gârla Ciulineț is a river in Romania, right tributary of the Danube. It flows into the Danube near Rachelu.

References

Rivers of Romania
Rivers of Tulcea County